The three teams in this group played against each other on a home-and-away basis. The group winner qualified for the seventh FIFA World Cup held in Chile.

Standings

Matches

References

External links
FIFA official page
RSSSF – 1962 World Cup Qualification
Allworldcup

6
1960–61 in English football
1961–62 in English football
qual
1960–61 in Portuguese football
1961–62 in Portuguese football
1960–61 in Luxembourgian football
1961–62 in Luxembourgian football